Blistering, founded in 1998, was an international online magazine dedicated to heavy metal and hard rock music. Its editor-in-chief was David E. Gehlke, an American music journalist who has written for About.com, Metal Maniacs, and Throat Culture. Blistering was cited as a source on heavy metal by the Chicago Sun-Times, Charleston's The Post and Courier, The Washington Times, Blabbermouth.net, The Current, and Pegasus News. The magazine went defunct in January 2013.

References

Online music magazines published in the United States
Defunct magazines published in the United States
Heavy metal publications
Magazines established in 1998
Magazines disestablished in 2013